Shiho Nakaji (born 15 April 2000) is a female Japanese artistic gymnast. In 2018, she won the bronze medal in the women's floor exercise event at the 2018 Asian Games in Jakarta, Indonesia. She also won the bronze medal in the women's team event.

References

External links 
 

Living people
2000 births
Place of birth missing (living people)
Japanese female artistic gymnasts
Gymnasts at the 2018 Asian Games
Medalists at the 2018 Asian Games
Asian Games bronze medalists for Japan
Asian Games medalists in gymnastics
21st-century Japanese women